Pedroche is a municipality in the province of Córdoba, Andalusia, Spain. It is located at the centre of Los Pedroches comarca, the northernmost part of Córdoba and Andalusia.

Landmarks 

Convent
The Convento de Nuestra Señora de la Concepción is a mudéjar building the year 500 b.c.

El Salvador (church)
Its construction is Catholic Monarchs, the stones of the Castle advantage previously demolished. Its clear structure can be seen Mudejar. It has three naves and can be classified among the religious monuments of the thirteenth century and fourteenth centuries, whose construction began after completion of the Reconquista by Fernando III. The head of the temple was built in the fifteenth century and was decorated with paintings of this era that can still be seen behind the Baroque altar. An original coffered ceiling in good condition, covers the central nave was made in the fifteenth century, all multicolored and beautiful execution. Striking is the small coffered ceiling over the Baptistery.

Renaissance Tower
Pedroche Tower national monument since 1979, is located on the highest part of town, next to the parish and Our Lady of the Castle. It is one of the most beautiful and graceful in Spain.

Using materials of the castle began construction of the tower, probably in 1520. From the second body, in 1544, the architect Hernán Ruiz the Younger took over management of the works, which he held until 1558. Architect known for transforming the minaret tower of the mosque in Cordoba and the Giralda bell tower. Juan de Ochoa finished the work by placing the barrel in 1588, apparently on the master designs.
The toweris composed four bodies, reachinga height of 56 meters. The first homer, the second octagonal bell tower is the third or square and the latter is cylindrical.

Ermita de la Virgen de Piedrasantas
It is located some kilometers of town and keep the Pedroche patron, the Piedrasantas Virgin. Built in the sixteenth century baroque stand it added in the eighteenth century. Inside are kept seven wooden benches with the names of the seven villages of Pedroches, whose representatives are gathered here to discuss issues common to the villas.

See also
Los Pedroches

References

External links
Pedroche en la Red
Solienses

Municipalities in the Province of Córdoba (Spain)